R. exigua may refer to:

 Reicheia exigua, a ground beetle
 Rimularia exigua, a lichenized fungus
 Rosenbergia exigua, a longhorn beetle